Western Spirit may refer to:

Western Spirit FC, an Australian football (soccer) club
, a United States Navy cargo ship in commission from 1918 to 1919
Western Spirit: Scottsdale’s Museum of the West